Platon Yakovlevich Gamaleya (1766–1817) was a Russian Empire naval officer and navigation scientist of Ukrainian origin. Gamaleya Rock, a rock formation in Antarctica, is named after him.

References

External links 
 

Ukrainian people in the Russian Empire
1766 births
1817 deaths
Imperial Russian Navy personnel